Vitalijus Kavaliauskas (born 2 July 1983) is a Lithuanian former footballer.

External links
 
 
 

1983 births
Living people
Place of birth missing (living people)
Lithuanian footballers
Lithuanian people of Russian descent
Lithuania international footballers
Association football forwards
Lithuanian expatriate footballers
Lithuanian expatriate sportspeople in Latvia
Expatriate footballers in Belarus
Expatriate footballers in Latvia
FK Ekranas players
FC Granit Mikashevichi players
FK Liepājas Metalurgs players
FK Utenis Utena players